Dokan may refer to:
 Lake Dokan, Iraq
 Dokan District, Iraq
 Dokan Library, free Microsoft Windows open source filesystem in userspace